The Swedish Magellanic expedition, 1907–09 was a scientific expedition undertaken by  Carl Johan Fredrik Skottsberg, Percy Dudgeon Quensel and Thore Gustaf Halle to study the geography, geology and flora of Patagonia. Other areas studied include Tierra del Fuego, Falkland Islands, Juan Fernández Islands, Chiloé Archipelago and Central Chile. Another of the expeditions goals were to study the Alakaluf Indians that lived in the channels of western Patagonia.

Carl Skottsberg  (1880–1963) was a botanist who was appointed professor and director of the  Göteborg Botanical Garden in 1919.
Percy Quensel (1881–1966)  was a geologist who was appointed professor of mineralogy and petrography at Stockholm University in 1914.
Thore Gustaf Halle  (1884–1964) was a botanist and geologist who became  professor and curator at the Swedish Museum of Natural History  in 1915.

See also 
 Swedish Antarctic Expedition

References

Other Sources 
 Swedish Magellanic Expedition: Preliminary report 
 Carl Johan Fredrik Skottsberg (Dictionary of Falklands Biography)
 Thore Gustaf Halle (Dictionary of Falklands Biography)

Related reading 
 Thore Gustaf Halle (1911) On the geological structure and history of the Falkland Islands (Uppsala University)
 Percy D. Quensel (1911) Geologisch-petrographische Studien in der patagonischen Cordillera (Uppsala University)
 Carl Skottsberg (1919) The Wilds of Patagonia (London: Edward Arnold)

Exploration of Chile
Exploration of South America
South American expeditions
Expeditions from Sweden
History of Patagonia